Eleventh finger may refer to:

Polydactyly, a congenital anomaly in humans having supernumerary fingers or toes
Pelvic digit, a congenital anomaly in humans, in which bone tissue develops in the soft tissue near the pelvis